Gold Collection may refer to:

 Gold Collection (Frank Sinatra album), 1994
 The Best of UFO: Gold Collection, 1996
 Too Much Too Young: The Gold Collection, 1996

See also
 Platinum & Gold Collection